Deseo (Spanish for "wish" or "desire"), or El Deseo may also refer to:

People
Csaba Deseo, violinist

Film and television
Deseo (2002 film), directed by Gerardo Vera
Deseo (2008 film), starring Edith González
Deseos, 1977 film starring Elpidia Carrillo
El Deseo (1944 film), directed by Carlos Schlieper
El Deseo (1948 film), directed by Chano Urueta
El Deseo S.A., film production company owned by Spanish film producers the Almodóvar brothers

Music

Albums
Deseo, by Anja Schneider and Lee Van Dowski, 2009
Deseo, by Franco Simone, 2006
Deseo, by Lorena Rojas, 2006
Deseo, by Pastora Soler
Deseo, soundtrack by Stephen Warbeck
Deseo (Jon Anderson album)
Deseo (Paulina Rubio album), 2018
Deseos (Mariem Hassan album)
Deseos, by Cuban band Arte Mixto, 1996
Deseo Carnal, by Alaska y Dinarama

Songs
"Deseo", by Alex Rivera
"Deseo", by Deborah Anderson, Jon Anderson and Cecilia Toussaint
"Deseo", by Grupo Montéz de Durango
"Deseo", by Jorge Drexler
"Deseo", by Luis Eduardo Aute
"Deseo", by Maelo Ruiz
"Deseo", by Mónica Naranjo, later covered by Myriam Hernández
"Deseo", by Pedro Guerra
"Deseo", by Tony Vega
"Deseo [Salsa Club Mix]", by Latin Blood and Joey Negro
"Deseos", by Eddie Santiago from Soy el Mismo
"Deseos", by Mariana Ochoa from Yo Soy

See also
Así te deseo, 1948 film
"Mi Deseo", a song by Marco Antonio Solís
"Tres Deseos", a song by Gloria Estefan